This is an incomplete list of newspapers published in Cameroon.

Newspapers 
 Cameroun Express
 Cameroon Tribune
 L'Expression de Mamy-Wata
 Le Messager
 Cameroon News Today - CNT

See also
 Media of Cameroon

External links 
 
 
 

  
Cameroon
newspapers